Piero Errani (born 28 December 1936) is an Italian former sports shooter. He competed at the 1972 Summer Olympics and the 1976 Summer Olympics.

References

1936 births
Living people
Italian male sport shooters
Olympic shooters of Italy
Shooters at the 1972 Summer Olympics
Shooters at the 1976 Summer Olympics
Sportspeople from Ravenna
20th-century Italian people